Houlbrooke is a surname. Notable people with the surname include:

 Theophilus Houlbrooke (1745–1824), British minister remembered mainly as an amateur botanist
 Ralph Houlbrooke, professor of early modern history at the University of Reading